Alfredo Chinetti (born 11 July 1949) is an Italian former professional racing cyclist. He rode in two editions of the Tour de France, nine editions of the Giro d'Italia and one edition of the Vuelta a España.

References

External links
 

1949 births
Living people
Italian male cyclists
Cyclists from the Province of Varese